Juy Sefid (also Romanized as Jūy Sefīd; also known as Jūb-e Sefīd, Jūb Sefīd, and Jūk-i-Sefīd) is a village in Baghestan Rural District, in the Central District of Bavanat County, Fars Province, Iran. At the 2006 census, its population was 365, in 83 families.

References 

Populated places in Bavanat County